Seemapuram also known as Seemavaram is a village in northern Tamil Nadu. It is located to the north of Chennai. It is located within Ponneri taluk and elects a Taluk administration councilor. In the 2011 census it had a population of 1876.

The village is inhabited by about 150 families almost 70% peoples are doing agriculture like paddy.  Facilities in the village include a government elementary school, a post office and an inter-city bus stop and the bus number 114S. The village also has a check dam across Kosasthalaiyar river that was built during the British administration of the Madras Presidency. The village has three temples. It is across the great small dam and one has to cross it to reach this village. It has a lavishing green fields and natural scape to its beauty.

Town of this village and postal code is Minjur - 601203. Now a new "400 ft" road formed near seemapuram from Vandalur to Minjur. This road bridge has used to cross the kosasthalaiyar river. Because it has not having separate bridge.

References

Villages in Kanchipuram district